Dr Andrew David Brownrigg (born 2 August 1976) is an English former professional footballer.

Football career 
Brownrigg began his career as a trainee with Hereford United, making his début during the 1994–95 season. In March 1995, after just eight league games for the Bulls, he was transferred to Norwich City for a fee of £100,000. He spent part of the following season on loan to Kettering Town and in August 1997 moved to Rotherham United having failed to make a first team appearance for Norwich, despite being an unused sub in the Premier League game against Arsenal at Highbury on 1 April 1995.

After being on the bench against Cambridge Utd during Rotherham United's opening game of the 1997–98 season, Brownrigg was attacked by a man with a hammer and suffered severe facial injuries. Due to his injuries Brownrigg missed a large portion of the season which hindered his opportunities at Rotherham. He joined Stalybridge Celtic on loan in March 1998 and was released by Rotherham at the end of the season. 
Brownrigg then joined Yeovil Town, but left for personal reasons and by November 1998 was again playing for Stalybridge Celtic. It was reported that Brownrigg would be signing for Tamworth that December, but this did not transpire so he, instead, signed for Stocksbridge Park Steels.

In July 1999, Brownrigg signed for Kidderminster Harriers and helped them to the Football Conference title, and with it promotion to the Football League. On 21 July 2000 Brownrigg was transferred to Scottish side Greenock Morton, costing £26,500. It later transpired that Morton was in turmoil off the field, with claims that they had failed to pay Kidderminster the fee for Brownrigg. By October 2000, Brownrigg was staying away from Morton claiming that the club also owed him money. The result was that Brownrigg played just three first team games before leaving in March 2001, joining Hartlepool United, although he was released in May 2001 having failed to break into the Hartlepool side.

He was linked with a return to Kidderminster, but in June 2001 joined Northwich Victoria. He subsequently moved to Hednesford Town later that year and moved to Gainsborough Trinity in June 2002. He was released in September 2002 and joined Wakefield & Emley. He had a trial with Worksop Town in the 2003 close season and also had a trial with Oxford United in November the same year. He joined Maltby Main, but left to join Ossett Albion. He then rejoined Maltby Main in January 2004 and signed for Conference side Scarborough in March 2004, but decided to leave the club the following month and rejoined Maltby Main for the final promotion push at the end of the season.

He subsequently joined Hallam in 2005,but left to join Buxton in the same year. He was virtually ever-present the following season when the Bucks won the NCEL Premier League title, and was extremely popular with the supporters at the Silverlands who adapted the 'Arthur Brownlow' song of Stockport County in his honour. He left Buxton in July 2006 because of travelling difficulties and the fact that he was about to embark on a Sports degree at University. He joined Sheffield FC in the close season of 2006. During that season, Brownrigg played a starring role in Sheffield's promotion from the NCEL Premier League, making it back to back promotions from the NCEL Premier League for him. At the end the season Brownrigg left Sheffield, and rejoined Hallam in November 2007.

In December 2008, he moved from Hallam to Staveley MW. In September 2009, Brownrigg left Staveley Miners Welfare to rejoin Hallam.

In March 2010, Brownrigg re-signed for Ossett Albion in the Northern Premier League for the purpose of fitness for a proposed move to Worksop Town FC. Andy signed for Worksop Town in the NPL Premier Division, after playing three games for Ossett.

At the beginning of the 2010–11 season Brownrigg signed for AFC Emley in the Northern Counties East League Division 1.

Personal life 

On 16 June 2008 Brownrigg was admitted to Sporting Chance, a recovery clinic set up by former England International Tony Adams MBE for sportsmen and women. During his time in the clinic Brownrigg was treated for addictive-related problems. Subsequently, on 11 June 2008, and thanks to a successful period of rehabilitation, Brownrigg returned home to Sheffield where, to this day, he remains in recovery.

Education and research 

On 16 July 2009, Brownrigg graduated with a First Class Honours Degree in Sport and Exercise Psychology at The University of Huddersfield. In recognition of his achievements and research area, the University offered Brownrigg a PhD Scholarship in 2009.

Brownrigg's research interests lie within the area of transition, with a specific focus on the experiences of professional footballers' during sporting exit/career transition.

In October 2012, Brownrigg's research gained recognition by The British Psychological Society when his work was published in the Qualitative Methods in Psychology, 'Sports and Performance' Bulletin.

References

External links

Profile at Flown From the Nest

Living people
1976 births
Footballers from Sheffield
English footballers
Hereford United F.C. players
Norwich City F.C. players
Kettering Town F.C. players
Rotherham United F.C. players
Stalybridge Celtic F.C. players
Yeovil Town F.C. players
Stocksbridge Park Steels F.C. players
Kidderminster Harriers F.C. players
Greenock Morton F.C. players
Hartlepool United F.C. players
Northwich Victoria F.C. players
Hednesford Town F.C. players
Gainsborough Trinity F.C. players
Wakefield F.C. players
Maltby Main F.C. players
Scarborough F.C. players
Hallam F.C. players
Buxton F.C. players
Sheffield F.C. players
Staveley Miners Welfare F.C. players
Ossett Albion A.F.C. players
Worksop Town F.C. players
Emley A.F.C. players
Association football defenders